Star quality may refer to:

Charisma, in quantities allowing for a chance at celebrity
Glamour (presentation)
 Star Quality, the last play by Noël Coward

 Star Quality, a novel by Joan Collins
 Star Quality, a romance-novel omnibus with works by Lori Foster, Lucy Monroe, and Dianne Castell
 Star Quality (film), an American short film featuring Jaime Ray Newman
 Star Quality (TV Series), a short lived UK gameshow hosted by Gyles Brandreth.